is a Japanese manga series written and illustrated by Yū Tomofuji. It was serialized in Hakusensha's shōjo manga magazine  Hana to Yume from November 2015 to October 2020. It is licensed in North America by Yen Press. An anime television series adaptation by J.C.Staff is set to premiere in April 2023.

Plot 

The King of the Beasts and Demons regularly receives female human sacrifices to eat in order to assert the dominance of his people over the human race. However, for the 99th sacrifice, the human girl brought to the capital, Sariphi, intrigues the Beast King. In fact she isn't afraid of him or any other beast and even accepts her death without begging or crying as she has neither home nor family to return to if she were released. The King finds her intriguing and let her stay at his side as his consort despite being human. This is the story of how Sariphi will become the queen of the demons and beasts.

Characters 

A girl sacrificed to the King of Beasts, nicknamed 'Sari' and future Queen of Beasts.

King of the kingdom of Ozmargo. Born as half-breed from beast father and human mother.

He is Leonhart's most trusted advisor. His real name is Sirius (シリウス, Shiriusu). His design is likely based on the  Pharaoh Hound

Princess of the Reptile Clan who fell in love with Jormungand. She's very shy and develops a good friendship with Sariphi. 

Childhood friend of Sariphi and he is in love with her.

Captain of the royal guard. Though he's equally shy to admit it, he returns Princess Amit's feelings. Near they end he openly admits he wanted children with her, to which they both blushed. 

A Phoenix. Sariphi's own Holy Beast.

The Queen's hyena personal guard. He's also called Lante.

Leonhart's Holy Beast.

She is the princess of Sarbul. She is the daughter of King Teto and Queen Calra. She had three eldest sisters and younger brother named Calcara.

His real name is Gleipnir.
Ocelot

Richard
Son of Sariphi and Leonhart. A very rambunctious and energetic, he switches from human to beast form randomly. He enjoys training with Lante and wants to be as strong as his father.

Media

Manga
The manga started serialization in Hakusensha's shōjo manga magazine Hana to Yume on November 5, 2015, and it ended on October 20, 2020. The manga was part of the initial lineup in Hakusensha's online shop selling series-themed goods. Yen Press announced that they had licensed the manga at Anime Expo 2017, releasing the first volume in May 2018. The manga is also licensed in Germany by Carlsen Verlag. A special edition of the sixth volume of the manga contained a CD of an audio drama adaptation of the series.

A spin-off manga began serialization in Hana to Yume on August 20, 2022.

Volume list

Sacrificial Princess and the King of Beasts

The White Rabbit and the Beast Prince

Anime
An anime television series adaptation was announced in the fourth issue of Hana to Yume on January 20, 2021. The series is produced by J.C.Staff and directed by Chiaki Kon, with scripts written by Seishi Minakami, character designs handled by Shinya Hasegawa, and music composed by Kohta Yamamoto. It is set to premiere on April 20, 2023, on Tokyo MX and BS11. Crunchyroll has licensed the series.

Reception
Rebecca Silverman from Anime News Network said that "Beauty and the Beast is alive and well in Sacrificial Princess and the King of Beasts – it's almost a by-the-book retelling of the classic fairy tale. That's definitely part of the appeal of this initial volume, because the Beauty of folklore isn't always as spunky as she could be, often winning over the Beast with her gentle ways and calm demeanor." Richard Gutierrez of The Fandom Post saw the story as more than a retelling, saying that the author "has sincerely crafted a narrative which engenders the reader on many fronts", complimenting the pair's relationship and its innocence. Sean Gaffney of Manga Bookshelf noted that the manga has nostalgic scenes that reference other series, liking the characterization of the characters and especially the protagonist, but was wary of her young age.

References

External links
  at Hana to Yume 
  
 

2023 anime television series debuts
Anime series based on manga
Crunchyroll anime
Fantasy anime and manga
Hakusensha manga
J.C.Staff
Romance anime and manga
Shōjo manga
Upcoming anime television series
Works based on Beauty and the Beast
Yen Press titles